Rahma Mastouri (born 29 December 1999 in Tunis) is a Tunisian artistic gymnast. She represented  Tunisia at the 2014 Summer Youth Olympics

Competitive History

2014 
Mastouri placed 11th at the African Junior Championships, consequently qualifying to the Youth Olympic Games.

Youth Olympics

References 

Tunisian female artistic gymnasts
1999 births
Gymnasts at the 2014 Summer Youth Olympics
Living people
People from Tunis
21st-century Tunisian women